The Novara ramming was a vehicle-ramming attack that occurred on the morning of 18 June 2021, during a protest outside a supermarket in Novara, Piedmont, Italy, resulting in one death and two injuries.

Attack
About 20 workers were protesting outside a Lidl supermarket in the Guido il Grande street in the Italian city of Novara, Piedmont, when a man intentionally rammed his truck into the crowd, killing the 33-year-old Si Cobas voice speaker Adil Belakhdim, and wounding two fellow workers. The driver escaped from the scene but was arrested minutes later.

References 

2021 crimes in Italy
2021 road incidents in Europe
2020s vehicular rampage
21st century in Piedmont
Attacks in Europe in 2021
June 2021 crimes in Europe
June 2021 events in Italy
Ramming
Road incidents in Italy
Vehicular rampage in Europe